Kirk Sanford Earlywine (born July 4, 1964) is an American college basketball coach who was most recently an assistant coach at the University of Idaho. Earlywine was head coach at Pfeiffer and Eastern Washington and has been an assistant coach at multiple other colleges.

Early life and education
Born in Indianapolis, Earlywine graduated from Campbell University in 1987 with a degree in physical education.  He got his first coaching experience at Campbell, serving as a student assistant for the Fighting Camels.

Coaching career
Earlywine's first full-time coaching experience came under the tutelage of Rick Majerus, beginning in 1987 at Ball State University for two seasons. Earlywine was part of the 1988–89 Ball State team that went 29–3 and qualified for the second round of the 1989 NCAA tournament. Earlywine then followed Majerus for his next assistant coaching job at the University of Utah, whey they worked together from 1989 to 1993 during four successful seasons, including the 1990–91 season with a 30–4 record and NCAA Sweet 16 appearance.

From 1993 to 1995, Earlywine was an assistant coach at Central Michigan under Leonard Drake. Earlywine had his first head coaching job in 1995–96 at Pfeiffer University, an NCAA Division II school in North Carolina. Earlywine led Pfeiffer to a 21–8 record and NCAA D-II Tournament appearance in his only season at the helm.

Earlywine returned to the Division I level, starting as an assistant coach at Milwaukee from 1996 to 1999. From 1999 to 2006, Earlywine was an assistant coach at Weber State for the entirety of Joe Cravens's tenure as head coach, during which Weber State qualified for the 2003 NCAA tournament. Earlywine spent the 2006–07 season on Benny Moss's staff at UNC Wilmington as an assistant.

On June 14, 2007, Eastern Washington hired Earlywine to replace the fired Mike Burns. Earlywine went 42–78 in four seasons at Eastern Washington. On March 7, 2011, Eastern Washington made the decision not to renew Earlywine's contract.

Earlywine worked for the regional TV network SWX Right Now as a college basketball color commentator during the 2011–12 season. In 2012, Earlywine joined the staff of Don Verlin at Idaho as director of player development before being promoted to assistant coach in 2013. In September 2019, three months after firing Verlin, Idaho placed Earlywine on administrative leave.

Head coaching record

Notes

External links
 

1964 births
Living people
Basketball coaches from Indiana
Ball State Cardinals men's basketball coaches
Campbell Fighting Camels basketball coaches
Campbell University alumni
Central Michigan Chippewas men's basketball coaches
College men's basketball head coaches in the United States
Eastern Washington Eagles men's basketball coaches
Milwaukee Panthers men's basketball coaches
Pfeiffer Falcons men's basketball coaches
Sportspeople from Indianapolis
UNC Wilmington Seahawks men's basketball coaches
Utah Utes men's basketball coaches
Weber State Wildcats men's basketball coaches